Ktismata is a village and a community in the municipal unit of Delvinaki, Ioannina regional unit, Epirus, Greece. It is situated on a hillside on the right bank of the river Drinos, at 412 m above sea level. It is 3 km from the Greek - Albanian border at Kakavia. The community consists of the villages Ktismata (2011 population: 246) and Neochori (pop. 7). Ktismata is 7 km southwest of Delvinaki, 30 km southeast of Gjirokastër (Albania) and 47 km northwest of Ioannina. The Greek National Road 22 (Kakavia - Kalpaki) passes north of the village.

Population

See also

List of settlements in the Ioannina regional unit

References

External links
Ktismata at the GTP Travel Pages

Populated places in Ioannina (regional unit)